Operophtera danbyi is a species of geometrid moths in the family Geometridae described by George Duryea Hulst in 1896. It is found in North America.

The MONA or Hodges number for Operophtera danbyi is 7439.

References

 Scoble, Malcolm J., ed. (1999). Geometrid Moths of the World: A Catalogue (Lepidoptera, Geometridae), 1016.

Further reading

 Arnett, Ross H. (2000). American Insects: A Handbook of the Insects of America North of Mexico. CRC Press.

External links

 Butterflies and Moths of North America
 NCBI Taxonomy Browser, Operophtera danbyi

Operophtera
Moths described in 1896
Moths of North America
Taxa named by George Duryea Hulst